James Victore (born in 1962, in the city of Mountain Home, Idaho) is an American art director, designer, and author.

Solo exhibitions

“James Victore: Post No Bills” DDD Gallery, Osaka, Japan, 1997
Moravian Gallery, Brno, The Czech Republic, 1998
Fronta Gallery, Prague April 2000
“American Modern Poster” China Fine Art Museum, Beijing, China 1999
“Furoshiki Graphics” GGG Gallery Tokyo, Japan, 1999
“Images of an Ideal Nation” DePaul University Art Gallery, 1998
“Texas Yum-Yum” Bolm Gallery, Austin, Texas, 2004
“James Victore: Dirty Dishes” Design Within Reach, New York City, 2005
“James Victore: In Gold We Trust” Future Perfect Gallery, Brooklyn, New York, 2006
“James Victore Loves His Country” University of Akron, Ohio, 2006
International Poster Biennales of Warsaw, Toyama, Brno, Helsinki, Moscow and Mexico

Collections

Museum of Modern Art, New York, NY
Palais du Louvre, Paris, France
Library of Congress, Washington, DC
Museum fur Gestaltung, Zurich
Stedelijk Museum, Amsterdam

Bibliography
Victore, James; Michael Bierut (2010) Victore or, Who Died and Made You Boss? Abrams 
Victore, James; Ross MacDonald (2011) In and Out with Dick and Jane: A Loving Parody Abrams Image 
Victore, James (2011) Lust: A Traveling Art Journal of Graphic Designer Rockport Publishers  
Victore, James (2019) Feck Perfuction: Dangerous Ideas on the Business of Life Chronicle Books

References

External links
Official Homepage
MoMA Collection, James Victore
Logo Geek Interview with James Victore

1962 births
American graphic designers
Living people
People from Mountain Home, Idaho